Muhammad Ariff Farhan bin Md Isa (born 14 July 1996) is a Malaysian professional footballer who plays as a left-back for Malaysia Super League club Kedah Darul Aman and the Malaysia national team. In October 2012, he became the youngest player to appear in that league at just 16 surpassing the previous record set by former Young Lions starlet Hariss Harun.

Career
Ariff Farhan attended Bukit Jalil Sports School at the age of 13 years. Then, he was selected into Bukit Jalil Sports School football team to participate in the President Cup Malaysia.

He was selected by the Harimau Muda A coach, Ong Kim Swee into Malaysia Under-22 for the 2013 AFC U-22 Asian Cup qualification. He was the youngest footballer in the tournament which just 16 years old.

After shows and outstanding performances in the tournament, he was added into Harimau Muda A squad competing in the S.League. He made his debut as a late substitute in the match against Balestier Khalsa on 7 October 2012 to become the youngest player ever to appear in the S.League, and started the game on 2 November in which Tampines Rovers defeated Harimau Muda A to confirm their S.League title.

International career
Mohd Ariff Farhan made his international debut for Malaysia Under-22 in the 2013 AFC U-22 Asian Cup qualification and 2012 SCTV Cup.

Career statistics

Club

Honours

Club
Kedah Darul Aman:
 Malaysia Cup: 2016
 Malaysian FA Cup: 2017
 Malaysia Charity Shield: 2017

International
Malaysia U-23
Southeast Asian Games
 Silver Medal: 2017

References

External links
 

1996 births
Living people
Malaysian footballers
People from Kedah
Association football midfielders
Southeast Asian Games silver medalists for Malaysia
Southeast Asian Games medalists in football
Competitors at the 2017 Southeast Asian Games
PKNS F.C. players
Kedah Darul Aman F.C. players
Felda United F.C. players